Surprise Attack Records, sometimes called SA Mob is an independent record label based in Philadelphia, although the bands are from Miami, Elkview, Erie, and even Adelaide, Australia. Surprise Attack Records signs Hardcore punk bands. In the early 2000s, the record label had close affiliations with Canadian record labels Goodfellow Records and Redstar Records.

Roster
current and past bands
 7 Generations
 All Hell Breaks Loose
 The Break In
 Die Young
 Hank Jones
 Holden Caulfield
 Pound for Pound
 Prayer for Cleansing
 Problem Solver Revolver
 Rise and Fall
 ShotPointBlank
 Target Nevada
 Twentyfour Hours to Live
 Van Damage
 When Tigers Fight
 Where it Ends

See also 
 List of record labels

References

External links 
 Official site
 SA Mob samples at hxcmp3.com
 Surprise Attack Records at MySpace

American independent record labels
Hardcore record labels